The Cordner–Eggleston Cup is a retrospective award commemorating the historic school football rivalry between Melbourne Grammar School and the Scotch College which has been contested since 1858. Competition between these schools is believed to have been pivotal in the establishment of Australian rules football.

The cup, instituted in 1989 was named after prominent alumni from the respective schools – Dr Don Cordner (Melbourne Grammar) and Mr Michael Eggleston (Scotch College). Prior to the award, the two schools competed for honours and were recorded in the yearbooks and other sports logbooks of the respective schools. Other prominent schools at times also competed in the prestigious tournaments since the 1860s, including Geelong Grammar School.

The first football fixture was played under experimental rules on 7 August 1858 at Yarra Park, Melbourne giving the Cup a claim to being the longest continuously running football competition in the world. It is also of cultural importance to Australia, as it is the best documented early football match in Australia and is believed by many historians to have played a key role in the Origins of Australian football. The first match is commemorated by a bronze statue depicting the game outside the Melbourne Cricket Ground (MCG).

The 150th anniversary of the cup was celebrated by the match being played at the MCG, where most notable football matches are played, including the Grand Final of the Australian Football League, the senior competition of Australian Rules.

The "first" match
The first game ran for three days, over three consecutive Saturdays, and each team selected an umpire: Melbourne Grammar chose Tom Wills; Scotch chose Dr John Macadam. By the completion of the third day, the match had resulted in a 1–1 draw.

In recent years historians have found evidence of earlier matches between the two schools, and subsequently the origin of the game remains one of the most contested areas of Australian history. Both Melbourne Grammar and Scotch have acknowledged the ongoing research of historians.

The Cup
The cup, instituted in 1989, is a retrospective award which was named after prominent alumni from the respective schools – Dr Don Cordner (Melbourne Grammar) and Mr Michael Eggleston (Scotch College).  Before the cup the clubs competed for honours and were recorded in the yearbooks and other sports logbooks of the respective schools.

Relationship with Australian football
Australian football is the code which the match is played today, however the first match was played under experimental rules.

The AFL Commission officially regards it as the first match of Australian football.

Historians draw a connection to the modern code of Australian football primarily through the involvement of Tom Wills as an organiser and participant as well as the fact that the match was co-ordinated by Thomas H. Smith who was later, along with Wills, one of the founders of the Melbourne Football Club and signatory of the first known Laws of Australian Football.  Wills is believed to have been involved due to his interest in establishing football in Victoria and experimenting with rules as part of his quest for a "code of laws" by which the game could be organised.

History has been uncovered which, in fact, suggests that Melbourne Grammar School played football against both St. Kilda Grammar School and a number of men from St. Kilda in June and July 1858. It was not until August that the two recognised schools met to play the "first" recorded match.

Tim Shearer of the Old Scotch Collegians Association, and a former AFL umpire, explaining to The Age that the College is "careful to say we don't dogmatically claim this was the first game of Australian football and that there are differing views which we respect. But we do like to say that this is the first recorded game by two teams who still exist today."

To celebrate the schools' 150-year-old rivalry, the Cordner–Eggleston Cup in 2008 was played at the Melbourne Cricket Ground; the match was won by Melbourne Grammar.

Outcome history

References

Australian rules football competitions in Victoria (Australia)
1858 establishments in Australia
Organizations established in 1858
Melbourne Grammar School